Matt McConnell (born 1963) is the current play by play announcer for the Arizona Coyotes. He is also a Faculty Associate at Arizona State University’s Walter Cronkite School of Journalism and Mass Communication.

Announcing career

NHL
McConnell got his start in the NHL as the radio play by play announcer for the Mighty Ducks of Anaheim, a position which he held from 1993-1996. At the end of 1996 he went to the Pittsburgh Penguins as their radio play by play announcer. In 1999, he joined the Atlanta Thrashers as the team's first ever TV play by play announcer, a position which he held from 1999–2003, and returned to from 2009-2011. From 2004–2006 he served as the Minnesota Wild TV play by play announcer. McConnell has also covered the NHL playoffs for NHL Radio and Westwood One. In 2013, he was named "Arizona Sports Broadcaster of the Year" by the National Sports Media Association. In 2020 and 2021, he was named a finalist for the same award.

College Sports
McConnell also has served as the lead play by play announcer for CBS College Sports Network college hockey broadcasts. He also covered college basketball, college football and college lacrosse.

World Juniors 
McConnell served as the play by play announcer for NHL Network coverage of the 2009 World Junior Ice Hockey Championships.

References 

Living people
American sports announcers
Anaheim Ducks announcers
Arizona Coyotes announcers
Atlanta Thrashers announcers
College basketball announcers in the United States
College football announcers
Minnesota Wild announcers
National Hockey League broadcasters
Pittsburgh Penguins announcers
Lacrosse announcers
College hockey announcers in the United States
1963 births